is a JR West Geibi Line station located in Uehara-chō, Shōbara, Hiroshima Prefecture, Japan.

The station features one side platform.

History
1 April 1987: Japan National Railways is privatized, and Bingo-Mikkaichi Station became a JR West station

Around the station
Bingo-Mikkaichi Station is located just west of downtown Shōbara. Taka Elementary is located near the station.

Highway access
Chūgoku Expressway
Japan National Route 183
Japan National Route 432
Hiroshima Prefectural Route 61 (Miyoshi-Shōbara Route)
Hiroshima Prefectural Route 231 (Shōbara Teishajō Route)
Hiroshima Prefectural Route 422 (Naka Ryōke Shōbara Route)

Connecting lines
All lines are JR West lines.
Geibi Line
Bingo-Shōbara Station — Bingo-Mikkaichi Station — Nanatsuka Station

External links
 JR West

Geibi Line
Railway stations in Hiroshima Prefecture
Railway stations in Japan opened in 1923
Shōbara, Hiroshima